Xäsänşäyex is a rural locality (a selo) in Arça District, Tatarstan. The population was 620 as of 2010.

Geography 
 is located 35 km east of Arça, district's administrative centre, and 111 km northeast of Qazan, republic's capital, by road.

History 
The earliest known record of the settlement dates from 1678.

From 17th to first half of the 19th centuries village's residents belonged to the social estate of state peasants.

The population of Xäsänşäyex reached its peak of about 1765 inhabitants in 1904. By the beginning of the twentieth century, village had 3 mosques, 2 madrasas, a watermill, a blacksmith shop, a pottery house, 8 small shops.

Before the creation of Tatar ASSR in 1920 was a part of Qazan Uyezd of Qazan Governorate. Since 1920 was a part of Arça Canton; after creation of districts in Tatar ASSR (Tatarstan) in Tüntär (1930–1963) and Arça districts.

Notable people 

References

External links 
 

Rural localities in Arsky District